Paul Owens is a British video game who worked at Ocean Software in the 1980s and 90s and was the founding programmer employed by Spectrum Games prior to Ocean Software being established. He is best known for writing the ZX Spectrum version of Daley Thompson’s Decathlon.
Mainly concentrating on the ZX Spectrum, he wrote over 14 titles but also collaborated on many other games and other platforms including the Amstrad CPC along with developing other software such as the Ocean Spectrum Loader and game development software.

In the 80s, Ocean Software collaborated with Sinclair Research to help develop the Sinclair hardware and Paul received a letter of commendation from Sir Clive Sinclair after helping to iron out some problems with the ZX Spectrum 128 (codenamed Derby) prior to its release.

Games

References

External links
 World of Spectrum

British computer programmers
Living people
Video game programmers
Year of birth missing (living people)